James B. Lynas (4 November 1942) was a Scottish footballer who played for Dumbarton, Ross County and Inverness Caledonian.

References

1942 births
Scottish footballers
Dumbarton F.C. players
Caledonian F.C. players
Ross County F.C. players
Scottish Football League players
Living people
Association football forwards